Honda Indy may refer to several IndyCar Series races sponsored by Honda:

 Honda Indy Toronto
 Honda Indy Edmonton
 Honda Indy Grand Prix of Alabama
 Honda Indy Grand Prix of Sonoma
 Honda Indy 200 at Mid-Ohio
 Honda Indy 225 at Pikes Peak
 Honda Indy 300 at Surfers Paradise

Honda